The 2016 Dwars door Vlaanderen (English: "Across Flanders") is a one-day road cycling race that took place in Flanders on 23 March 2016. It was the 71st edition of the Dwars door Vlaanderen race.

The race is part of the cobbled classics season. It uses some of the same roads and climbs as other such races, including the Tour of Flanders. The defending champion was Jelle Wallays.

The day before the race was due to take place, there was a series of attacks in Brussels. This caused a heightened security level in Belgium and led to the possibility that the race would be cancelled. The organisers of the race decided to continue, however, with the final decision to be taken by the Belgian government on the day of the race itself. , one of the teams scheduled to take part in the race, was forced to withdraw: they had entered the minimum number of riders (six); three of these were unable to travel to Belgium because their flights were cancelled. The race started as planned, following a minute's silence. Like , several other teams had riders unable to attend the race due to travel restrictions; Movistar started the race with four riders instead of eight.

The race was won by Jens Debusschere in a sprint finish, after his teammates chased down Greg Van Avermaet in the closing kilometres. Bryan Coquard finished second, with Edward Theuns third.

Teams 

The race organisers originally invited 23 teams to take part in the race. Because of the attacks in Belgium and the subsequent travel restrictions,  were forced to withdraw, so 22 teams started the race. Of these, 11 were UCI WorldTeams and 11 were UCI Professional Continental teams.

Route 

The race started in Roeselare and followed a  course to finish in Waregem. It began with a long flat section that took the riders generally east from Roeselare and into Waregem; it then left the town and went south. At Avelgem, the course turned back east again to cross the first climb, the Nieuwe Kwaremont, after . This was followed by the climb of the Kattenberg, then the cobbled flat sectors of the Holleweg and the Haaghoek, then the climbs of the Leberg and the Berendries. After the next climb, the Valkenberg, the course turned back west towards the finish, with  remaining. The Eikenberg and the Taaienberg followed soon after, then the combination of the Oude Kwaremont and the Paterberg. After the final flat cobbled sector, the Varentstraat, the course turned north for the final three climbs: the Vossenhol (Tiegemberg), Holstraat and Nokereberg.

Race summary 

At the start of the race, there were 161 riders in the peloton. Most of these wore black armbands following the previous day's attacks. The breakaway took half an hour's racing to form, with Alexis Gougeard, Jesper Asselman, Alex Kirsch, Phil Bauhaus, Igor Boev, and Kevin Van Melsen forming a six-man breakaway and built a lead  of up to eight minutes. Preben Van Hecke and Kenneth Vanbilsen made unsuccessful attempts to escape from the peloton, with  chasing hard and bringing the breakaway's advantage down to three minutes. Mike Teunissen attacked from the peloton and was joined by Jonas Rickaert and Luke Durbridge. Boev and Gougeard were dropped from the breakaway and joined the chasing group on the Taaienberg, with a group of about eleven riders breaking away from the peloton. Van Melsen then attacked alone on the Oude Kwaremont. The two chasing groups came together shortly afterwards, with a group led by Greg Van Avermaet (BMC) chasing behind. After more attacks, the lead group was reduced to seven riders with  remaining and,  later, the front groups came together. He was caught with around  remaining, leaving a group of 34 riders to sprint for the finish. 's Fernando Gaviria was the first to sprint, but he faded quickly and ended up tenth. Bryan Coquard had a lead and came close to the victory, but his celebration before the finish line allowed Jens Debusschere to take the win in a photo finish.

Result

References

External links 

 

Dwars door Vlaanderen
Dwars door Vlaanderen
Dwars door Vlaanderen
Sport in Roeselare
March 2016 sports events in Europe